Kensal Rise is a London Overground station on the North London line on Chamberlayne Road, Kensal Rise in north-west London. The station is in Travelcard Zone 2.

History
It opened in 1873 as Kensal Green, replacing Kensal Green & Harlesden railway station which opened in 1861 at the crossing of Green Lane (later Wrottesley Road), lying in between the present station and Willesden Junction. The present station was renamed Kensal Rise in 1890. It is close to the newer  station built on the Watford DC Line in 1916. Since late 2007 both stations are now served by London Overground, although Kensal Green is managed by London Underground, being additionally served by the Bakerloo line.

Services
Kensal Rise currently has the following London Overground (North London Line) services, which is operated by Class 378 trainsets. The typical off-peak service in trains per hour (tph) is:
6 eastbound tph to Stratford
4 westbound tph to Richmond
2 westbound tph to Clapham Junction

Connections
The station is well served for onward travel as London Bus routes 6, 28, 52, 187, 302 and 452 either pass by or terminate at the station.

Accessibility
Kensal Rise became fully step-free in November 2015, with the addition of a lift.

See also
Kensal Green station

References

External links

 Excel file displaying National Rail station usage information for 2005/06

Former London and North Western Railway stations
Railway stations in the London Borough of Brent
Railway stations in Great Britain opened in 1873
Railway stations served by London Overground